Christopher S. Ripley is a Canadian media executive. He is the President and CEO of Sinclair Broadcast Group.

Background
Chris Ripley has been the President and CEO of Sinclair Broadcast Group since January 2017 after serving as their Chief Financial Officer from April 2014 to January 2017. Ripley also serves as an Investor Director of hibu.

Before joining Sinclair, he was a managing director at UBS Investment Bank’s Global Media Group and served as head of their Los Angeles office. At UBS, Ripley advised, managed, and structured various financings along with acquisition and merger transactions in the entertainment and broadcast sectors. Before that position, he served as a principal in Prime Ventures as well as being an analyst in the investment banking division at Donaldson, Lufkin & Jenrette.

Ripley is a graduate of the University of Western Ontario.

References

External links
 

Living people
Canadian media executives
Year of birth missing (living people)